"Don't Ever Leave Me" is a song by American singer Jermaine Stewart, which was released as the fourth and final single from his 1986 album Frantic Romantic. The song was written by Stewart, Jeffrey Cohen and Narada Michael Walden, and produced by Walden.

"Don't Ever Leave Me" was released as a single in America in 1986 by Arista, and the UK in 1987 by 10 Records. The single peaked at number 76 in the UK Singles Chart and remained in the top 100 for three weeks. The B-side for the single, "Give Your Love to Me", was taken from Frantic Romantic.

Critical reception
On its release, David Quantick of New Musical Express described the song as a "mildly glum" ballad and added, "The guitar reminds me of 'Rainy Night in Georgia', the tune reminds one of any number of rainy nights anywhere." Lucy O'Brien of New Musical Express also reviewed the single and considered it to be "inoffensive slow-moving, soporific weasley-voiced daytime radio fodder".

Formats
7-inch single
"Don't Ever Leave Me" - 4:12
"Give Your Love to Me" - 4:20

12-inch single
"Don't Ever Leave Me" (Extended) - 5:00
"Don't Ever Leave Me" - 4:19
"Give Your Love to Me" - 4:20

Personnel
 Narada Michael Walden - producer

Charts

References

1986 songs
1987 singles
Jermaine Stewart songs
Songs written by Narada Michael Walden
Song recordings produced by Narada Michael Walden
Songs written by Jeffrey E. Cohen
Songs written by Jermaine Stewart